The Women's individual table tennis - Class 8 tournament at the 2012 Summer Paralympics in London took place from 30 August to 3 September 2012 at ExCeL London. Classes 6–10 were for athletes with a physical impairment who competed from a standing position; the lower the number, the greater the impact the impairment was on an athlete’s ability to compete.

In the preliminary stage, athletes competed in two groups of four. Top two in each group qualified for the semi-finals.

Results
All times are local (BST/UTC+1)

Finals

Preliminary round

Group A

30 August, 09:40

30 August, 09:40

30 August, 18:40

|30 August, 18:40

31 August, 16:00

31 August, 16:00

Group B

30 August, 09:40

30 August, 09:40

30 August, 19:20

|30 August, 19:20

31 August, 16:00

31 August, 16:00

References

WI08
Para